Everlasting is the twelfth studio album by American country music artist Martina McBride. It was released on April 8, 2014, on McBride's own label through Kobalt Label Services. The album features covers of soul and R&B songs. It was produced by Don Was and includes duets with Gavin DeGraw and Kelly Clarkson.

Critical reception

Everlasting garnered generally positive reception from five music critics. At The Oakland Press, Gary Graff rated the album three stars out of four, saying how the release "is a welcome and successful exercise in creative stretching." Stephen Thomas Erlewine rated the album three-and-a-half stars out of five, remarking how "There's warmth in Was' production and honey in McBride's voice and if the combination can sometimes result in too-sweet tea, it's nevertheless soothing." At USA Today, Jerry Shriver rated the album three stars out of four, indicating how "Covering classic soul tunes is an overdone concept, but this well chosen collection shines". Jon Freeman of Country Weekly graded the album an A−, writing that "Overall the recording sounds great—warm and intimate without sacrificing polish." At The Boston Globe, Sarah Rodman gave a positive review, stating that the release "finds the mighty-voiced McBride deftly tackling a clutch of pop, soul, and blues tunes complete with horns, a sultry Southern organ sound, and heavenly harmonies from the McCrary Sisters."

McBride embarked on the Everlasting Tour in supporting of the album beginning May 8, 2014, in Kansas.

Track listing

Personnel

Rayse Biggs – trumpet
Tom Bukovac – acoustic and electric guitars
Vinnie Ciesielski – trumpet
Kelly Clarkson – duet vocals on "In the Basement"
Eric Darken – percussion
Gavin DeGraw – duet vocals on "Bring It On Home to Me"
Charles Dixon – viola, violin
Shannon Forrest – drums, percussion
Edward Gooch – trombone
Vicki Hampton – backing vocals
Mike Henderson – electric guitar, harmonica
Timothy Hewitt – alto saxophone
John Hinchey – trombone
Jim Hoke – horn arrangements, tenor saxophone
Dann Huff – electric guitar
Charlie Judge – organ, piano, strings
Randy Leago – baritone saxophone
Martina McBride  – handclaps, percussion, lead and backing vocals
Alfreda McCrary – handclaps, backing vocals
Ann McCrary – handclaps, backing vocals
Regina McCrary – handclaps, backing vocals
Kevin McKendree  – organ, piano, Wurlitzer
Jim Medlin  – Fender Rhodes, organ, piano, Wurlitzer
Andrea Merritt – backing vocals
Gordon Mote – Farfisa organ, piano
Wendy Moten – backing vocals
Patrick O'Conner – drums
Steve Patrick – flugelhorn, trumpet
Luis Resto – keyboards
Michael Rhodes – bass guitar
Paul Riser – horn arrangements, conductor
Don Was – handclaps, producer
Reggie Young – electric guitar

Chart performance
The album debuted at No. 7 on the Billboard 200, and at No. 1 on the Top Country Albums chart, with sales of 21,000 in the US. 
The album has sold 70,000 copies in the U.S as of April 2016.
 
McBride made history with the album by becoming the first ever female artist in the 50-year history of the Top Country Albums chart to debut at No. 1 with an independently released and distributed album.

Weekly charts

Year-end charts

References

2014 albums
Covers albums
Martina McBride albums
Albums produced by Don Was